Guro Kleven Hagen (born 11 May 1994) is a Norwegian violinist raised in Fagernes. She is the First concertmaster at the Norwegian National Opera and Ballet orchestra since January 2018.

Biography 
In 2012 Kleven Hagen attended studies with Professor Antje Weithaas at the Hochschule für Musik "Hanns Eisler" in Berlin following many years of studies at Barratt Due Institute of Music.

In 2010 Kleven Hagen won the title Virtuoso performing Tchaikovsky's Violin Concerto, and was the winner of "Den norske solistpris" and became the Norwegian participant in Eurovision Young Musicians 2010 where sh came second. That same year she became the first Norwegian finalist in Menuhin Competition where she was awarded the EMCY prize. In 2011 she debuted with Oslo Philharmonic, and has been soloist in Germany, Russia, Austria, Denmark, Sweden, Poland, Israel, and Norway.

Kleven Hagen is performing on a violin made by C. Bergonzi (Cremona, Italy) made about 1735–40, also known as Kreisler-Bergonzi on loan from Dextra Musica.

Honors 
 2010: Winner of Virtuoso
 2010: Awarded Den norske solistpris
 2010: No 2 in Eurovision Young Musicians
 2010: Finalist in the Menuhin competition, as well as winner off the EMCY prize
 2011: Awarded Karolineprisen
 2013: Awarded Statoil's talent scholarship in classical music
 2014: Awarded Arve Tellefsen's Musician Prize
 2017: Nominated for the 2017 Spellemannprisen in the category classical music for Fait pleurer les songes together with Marianna Shirinyan

References

External links 
 
 Nordic Artists Management
 NRK: Guro til finalen i Wien (Guro to the final in Vienna)
 NRK: Nå gjelder det for Guro (This is the moment for Guro)

Norwegian classical violinists
21st-century classical violinists
Child classical musicians
Barratt Due Institute of Music alumni
Eurovision Young Musicians Finalists
1994 births
People from Nord-Aurdal
Living people
21st-century Norwegian women musicians